Gampola is a town and once an ancient polity located near Kandy in the Central Province of Sri Lanka. It was made the capital city of the island by King Buwanekabahu IV, who ruled for four years in the mid-fourteenth century. King Buwanekabahu IV (son of King Vijayabahu V) ascended to the throne after his father and shifted the capital from Kurunegala to Gampola, with the support of General Senalankadhikara.

After his death, his brother, King Parakramabahu V (1353 AD - 1359 AD), who used to reign from Dedigama ascended the throne and moved to Gampola. He was dethroned by King Buwanekabahu IV's son, King Vikramabahu III (1359 AD - 1374 AD) and sent to Malaya.

King Vikramabahu III conveyed the tooth relic to Gampola and held a festival in honour of this sacred relic. He built a shrine at Niyamgampaya in Gampola. The rock temple "Gadaladeniya Viharaya" was constructed by king Vikramabahu III. Meanwhile, a general called "Alagakkonara" became more powerful than the king as they helped to defeat "Araya Chakravarthi", a Tamil ruler who had grabbed the throne of the northern country.

There are many Buddhist temples belonging to the Gampola era like "Lankathilaka" and "Ambekke dewalaya".

The last king of Gampola was King Buwanekabahu V. He ruled the island for 29 years. At the same time, King "Weerabahu II" (1392-1397 AD) ruled Raigama. King "Vijayabahu VI" (1397-1411 AD), who is from the Alagakkonara family, grabbed the throne from king Weerabahu II. The Chinese ambassador Zheng He, who was unhappy with the change of hands, carried off King Vijayabahu VI to China in 1411 AD. The next kingdom was the Kotte kingdom.  A separate city was built in Kotte during this time by a noble known as Alagakkonara.

References

 
1345 establishments in Asia
14th-century establishments in Sri Lanka
1406 disestablishments in Asia
15th-century disestablishments in Sri Lanka
Transitional period of Sri Lanka
Kingdoms of Sri Lanka
Former monarchies of South Asia